Iligan Bay Alliance of Misamis Occidental (IBAMO) is an organization in Misamis Occidental tasked with protecting the Iligan Bay, Philippines from pollution, overfishing and overharvesting of marine resources. IBAMO covers the  coasts of the municipalities of Tudela, Sinacaban, Jimenez, Panaon, Aloran, Lopez Jaena and Plaridel and the city of Oroquieta. IBAMO was originally the Iligan Bay Coastal Resource Management and Development Program (IBRCMDP) in 2005. In 2010, it became an alliance known as the Iligan Bay Alliance of Misamis Occidental. From 2011 to 2013, the WorldFish project “From Ridge to Reef (R2R): An Ecosystem Approach to Biodiversity Conservation and Development in the Philippines” continued the support with funding from USAID to strengthen and expand the membership of IBAMO.

Misamis Occidental Provincial Ordinance No. 99-16
“AN ORDINANCE ADOPTING THE HARMONIZED ILIGAN BAY ALLIANCE IN MISAMIS OCCIDENTAL FISHERIES CODE”. Provides the framework of the organization and operation of IBAMO, including its powers, duties and functions.

Members

Local Government Units
 Provincial Government of Misamis Occidental
 Municipal Government of Tudela
 Municipal Government of Sinacaban
 Municipal Government of Jimenez
 Municipal Government of Panaon
 Municipal Government of Aloran
 City Government of Oroquieta
 Municipal Government of Lopez Jaena
 Municipal Government of Plaridel

Partner Institutions
 Bureau of Fisheries and Aquatic Resources (BFAR-X)
 Department of Agriculture (DA-X)
 Department of Environment and Natural Resources (DENR-X)
 Department of Tourism (DOT-X)
 Department of Interior and Local Government (DILG-X)
 Department of Science and Technology (DOST-X)
 Department of Labor and Employment (DOLE-X)
 Department of Trade and Industry (DTI-X)
 Misamis University
 University of Science and Technology of Southern Philippines

Nature conservation organisations based in the Philippines
Marine conservation organizations
Misamis Occidental

References